Professional agrologist (abbreviated PAg) in Canada, also called agronome (abbreviated agr.) in Québec, is the professional designation for the agrology profession in Canada. There are more than 10,000 professional agrologists and agronomes in Canada, registered in ten (10) provincial institutes of agrologists.  In the United States the professional designation is Certified Professional Agronomist (abbreviated C.PAg) .

Role of the agrologist

Agrologists are science based consultants, educated and specializing in areas such as animal science, food science, genetic engineering, soil science and environmental sciences.  Professional agrologists may provide advice directly to farmers, vineyards, agricultural corporations.

Alternate certifications
In the United States, the American Society of Agronomy is the regulatory organization responsible for certification. The American Society of Agronomy uses a sliding scale of education and experience to determine certification - it is required to have either a bachelor's degree in science and 5 years work experience, a master's degree related to agrology and 3 years work experience, or a Doctorate related to agrology and a single year of work experience. The American Society of Agronomy also provides certifications for Certified Crop Advisors (CCA).

See also
Agronomy
Agricultural Science
Agricultural engineering
Horticulture
Animal Science
Botany
American Society of Agronomy
Forestry
Aquaculture
Forestry

References

External links
 American Society of Agronomy
 Agricultural Institute of Canada
  Alberta Institute of Agrologists
 British Columbia Institute of Agrologists
 Manitoba Institute of Agrologists
 New Brunswick Institute of Agrologists
 Newfoundland and Labrador Institutes of Agrologists
 Nova Scotia Institute of Agrologists
 Ontario Institute of Agrologists
 Prince Edward Island Institute of Agrologists
 Saskatchewan Institute  of Agrologists
 l'Ordre des Agronomes du Québec
 British Columbia Institute of Agrologists

 Agrologist
Professional titles and certifications
Agrologist